Tse Man Wing (born 5 January 1983 in Hong Kong) is a former Hong Kong professional footballer who currently plays as an amateur player for Hong Kong First Division club Tai Po.

Career statistics

Club career
As of 4 April 2008

International career
As of 6 December 2006

References

External links
 
 Tse Man Wing at HKFA

1983 births
Living people
Association football defenders
Hong Kong footballers
South China AA players
Hong Kong Rangers FC players
Sun Hei SC players
Southern District FC players
Eastern Sports Club footballers
Dreams Sports Club players
Hong Kong First Division League players
Hong Kong Premier League players
Hong Kong international footballers
Footballers at the 2006 Asian Games
Asian Games competitors for Hong Kong